Forever War may refer to:

 The Forever War, a 1974 science fiction novel by Joe Haldeman
 The Forever War, a graphic novel adaptation of the above
 Forever war, concept of fighting a war without an expectation that it can ever end
 War on terror, an international military campaign launched by the United States, following the September 11 attacks in 2001